The Kuwaiti passport is a passport document issued to citizens of Kuwait for international travel.

Types
There are four types of Kuwaiti passports: 
 Regular passport (blue cover): issued to citizens of Kuwait.
 Special passport (green cover): a special passport issued to the Kuwaiti ruling family, members of parliament and high-ranking government officials. 
 Diplomatic passport (red cover): a diplomatic passport issued to diplomats serving in Kuwaiti embassies abroad and to high-ranking officials from the executive branch.
  Article 17 passport (gray cover): a passport issued to the stateless Bedoon population in Kuwait for international travel. This passport does not hold the same visa requirements as the regular Kuwaiti passport.

Appearance characteristics 

The passport of a Kuwaiti citizen is distinguished by its blue colour and contains 64 pages. Each biometric passport contains an electronic chip that stores the passport holder's text and biometric personal data.

Identification page 

The identity page of Kuwaiti passport  includes the following data:

 Passport holder photo 4x5 cm with blue background
 Type ("P" for passport)
 Code of the country
 Serial number of the passport
 Surname and first name of the passport holder
 Citizenship
 Date of birth (DD.MM.YYYY)
 Gender (M for men or F for women)
 Place of Birth
 Date of issue (DD.MM.YYYY)
 Passport holder's signature
 Expiry date (DD.MM.YYYY)

Passport note 
The following message is written on the front page of the passport in Arabic and English.

Arabic:«باسم حضرة صاحب السمو أمير دولة الكويت أطلب من موظفي دولة الكويت وممثليها في الخارج، وأرجو من كل سلطة أخرى تعمل باسمها ومن السلطات الأجنبية المختصة أن يسمحو لحامل هذا الجواز بحرية المرور وأن يقدموا كل ما يحتاج إليه من مساعدة ورعاية.»English:"In The Name Of H.H The Amir of The State Of Kuwait, I request from all officials of The State Of Kuwait and its representatives abroad and all authorities acting in his name and the competent foreign authorities to allow the bearer of this passport to pass freely and to afford every assistance and protection of which the bearer my stand in need."

Visa requirements

In June 2019, Kuwaiti citizens had visa-free or visa on arrival access to 98 countries and territories, ranking the Kuwaiti passport 44th in the world according to the Visa Restrictions Index.

See also
 Visa policy of Kuwait

References

Kuwait
Government of Kuwait
Foreign relations of Kuwait
Law of Kuwait